Κleidi is a village in the municipality of Amyntaio, in the Florina regional unit of West Macedonia, Greece. The Battle of Vevi (1941) was fought near here.

History
In 1845 the Russian slavist Victor Grigorovich recorded Tsrevo as mainly Bulgarian village.

In the book “Ethnographie des Vilayets d'Adrianople, de Monastir et de Salonique”, published in Constantinople in 1878, that reflects the statistics of the male population in 1873, Tzerovo was noted as a village with 30 households and 76 male  Bulgarian inhabitants. According to the statistics of Geographers Dimitri Mishev and D. M. Brancoff, the village had a total Christian population of 400 in 1905, consisting of 200 Exarchist Bulgarians and 200 Patriarchist Bulgarians (Grecomans). It also had 2 schools, 1 Bulgarian and 1 Greek.

References

Populated places in Florina (regional unit)